Pipturus platyphyllus  is a species of plant in the family Urticaceae.

Distribution
This species is endemic to Fiji.

References
Catalogue of Life

platyphyllus
Endemic flora of Fiji